Phalaenoides tristifica, the willow-herb day, is a moth of the family Noctuidae that is native to southeastern Australia. The species was first described by Jacob Hübner in 1818.

Description

References 

}

Noctuidae
Moths described in 1818